Canosa is a surname. Notable people with the surname include:

Erick Cañosa, Filipino politician and medical technologist
Hans Canosa (born 1970), American film director, screenwriter, film editor, and producer 
Jorge Mas Canosa (1939–1997), Cuban-born American businessman
Rodrigo Canosa (born 1988), Uruguayan footballer